Eddie Okechukwu Iroh is a Nigerian novelist and broadcaster. He is commonly known as the writer of the 1981 novel Without a Silver Spoon which was published as part of the Heinemann African Writers Series.

Bibliography 
 Forty-Eight Guns for the General
 Without a Silver Spoon
 Banana Leaves

References 

Nigerian broadcasters
20th-century Nigerian novelists
Year of birth missing (living people)
Living people